Alaska USA Federal Credit Union is a credit union headquartered in Anchorage, Alaska, chartered and regulated under the authority of the National Credit Union Administration (NCUA).  In the United States, Alaska USA is among the largest credit unions by assets, and it is among the 20 largest credit unions by membership.
 
Alaska USA is a federally chartered, member-owned, not-for-profit financial cooperative with more than 100 branch offices and service locations throughout Alaska, Arizona's Maricopa County, California's San Bernardino County, and Washington State. As of 2017, Alaska USA had $6.9 billion in assets and more than 600,000 members.

The credit union is the leading provider of consumer financial services in Alaska, with growing membership in all 50 states. Alaska USA provides deposit accounts, consumer loans, credit cards, 24/7 support, and online and mobile account management. In a growing number of locations, Alaska USA provides commercial products, personal insurance, real estate loans, and financial planning and investment services.

The credit union also owns and operates Alaska USA Insurance Brokers in Alaska and Washington, and Alaska USA Mortgage Company in Alaska, California, and Washington.

On September 16, 2003, Alaska USA established the Alaska USA Foundation to support 501(c)(3) organizations that provide non-discriminatory, needs-based services to children and veterans of the armed services. On June 4, 2009, Alaska USA Foundation amended its articles of incorporation to provide support to any 501(c)(3) organization.

They have announced on April 3, 2023, to be changing their name to Global Credit Union.￼

History

Alaska USA was founded in 1948 by 15 volunteers and originally chartered as the Alaskan Air Depot Federal Credit Union to provide financial services to military personnel and federal employees stationed in pre-statehood Alaska.

By 1974, the credit union's membership grew to include more than 20,000 workers of the services companies of the Trans-Alaska Pipeline System. During this same period, Alaska USA received congressional authority to provide services to 10 of the Alaska Native Regional Corporations under the Alaska Native Claims Settlement Act. To reflect this growing field of membership, Alaska USA adopted its current name in 1975.

The credit union entered the Pacific Northwest market in 1983 by merging with Whidbey Federal Credit Union in Oak Harbor. Alaska USA gained a statewide community charter in Washington following the merger of two other Seattle-based credit unions in 2010.

Alaska USA expanded into California's San Bernardino County in 2009 by acquiring the High Desert Federal Credit Union of Apple Valley, California, and the Members Own Federal Credit Union of Victorville, California. This growth continued with the acquisition of Arrowhead Credit Union in 2010, and their branches in Barstow, Victorville, Big Bear, and Hesperia, California.

In 2014, Alaska USA opened its first Arizona branch in Glendale. Shortly after in 2015, the credit union was granted authorization by the NCUA to qualify members in underserved areas in Maricopa County. In 2020, they further expanded in Arizona with the acquisition of the seven branches of TCF Bank in the area.

References

External links
 

1948 establishments in Alaska
Banks established in 1948
Companies based in Anchorage, Alaska
Credit unions based in Alaska
Non-profit organizations based in Anchorage, Alaska